Luke Humphrey (born June 12, 1987) is an American-born Canadian actor. He is most noted for his performance as John Wayne Bobbitt in the television film I Was Lorena Bobbitt, for which he won the Canadian Screen Award for Best Actor in a Television Film or Miniseries at the 10th Canadian Screen Awards in 2022.

Early life 
The son of Canadian actors Mark Humphrey and Wendel Meldrum, he was born in California while his parents were working in Hollywood.

Career 
Humphrey had his first film acting role in the 2005 film Cruel but Necessary, alongside both of his parents even though they were already divorced. His other roles have included the films I Don't Want to Kill Myself (2011) and Trench 11 (2017), the television series Frankie Drake Mysteries and Tiny Pretty Things, and the web series Chateau Laurier, as well as stage roles in Stratford Festival productions of The Three Musketeers and Shakespeare in Love.

Filmography

Film

Television

References

External links

1987 births
Living people
21st-century American male actors
21st-century Canadian male actors
American male film actors
American male stage actors
American male television actors
American male web series actors
Canadian male film actors
Canadian male stage actors
Canadian male television actors
Canadian male web series actors
Canadian Screen Award winners